Fuladh ibn Manadhar, was a Justanid prince, who served as a high-ranking military officer of the Buyid dynasty.

Biography 

Fuladh was the son of Manadhar, a Justanid king. Fuladh had a brother named Khusrau Shah, who ruled Rudbar after Manadhar. He also had an unnamed sister, who married the Buyid ruler Adud al-Dawla, and bore him two sons, Abu'l-Husain Ahmad and Abu Tahir Firuzshah. During that period, Fuladh, along with a Gilaki officer named Ziyar ibn Shahrakawayh, dominated the Buyid court of Baghdad. After the death of Adud al-Dawla, the Buyid Empire was thrown into civil war; the Empire was disputed between his two sons Samsam al-Dawla and Sharaf al-Dawla. Samsam al-Dawla ruled Iraq, while Sharaf al-Dawla ruled Fars and Kerman.

In 986, a Daylamite officer named Asfar ibn Kurdawayh rebelled against Samsam al-Dawla, and changed his allegiance to Sharaf al-Dawla. However, Asfar quickly changed his mind, and declared allegiance to the latter's other brother Abu Nasr Firuz Kharshadh, who was shortly given the honorific epithet of "Baha' al-Dawla." However, Samsam al-Dawla, with the aid of Fuladh, suppressed the rebellion, and imprisoned Baha al-Dawla. Samsam al-Dawla shortly made peace with Sharaf al-Dawla, and agreed to release Baha al-Dawla. In 987, Sharaf al-Dawla betrayed Samsam al-Dawla, conquered Iraq, and had him imprisoned in a fortress. He then imprisoned Fuladh and had Ziyar executed.

In 988/989, Fuladh was released. After his release, Fuladh then began serving Samsam al-Dawla once again, this time in Shiraz, where he once again became a prominent figure in his court. However, Fuladh later tried to remove the viceroy of Shiraz, which forced him to flee from the wrath of Samsam. Fuladh managed to reach to the court of Fakhr al-Dawla in Ray, where he stayed until death about 994. He had a son named Ibn Fuladh, who would later challenge Buyid authority and claim Qazvin as a part of his own domain.

References

Sources 

 
 

Daylamites
Buyid generals
Justanids
Year of birth unknown
Year of death uncertain
990s deaths
10th-century Iranian people